Kola Kolaya Mundhirika is a 2010 Indian Tamil-language comedy film written by Crazy Mohan and directed by Madhumitha. The film stars  Jayaram, Karthik Kumar, and Shikha along with numerous popular Tamil comedy artists including M. S. Bhaskar, Pandiarajan, Anandaraj, Vasu Vikram and Vaiyapuri playing supporting roles. The film started its shooting on 8 May 2009 and released on 21 May 2010.

Cast 

Jayaram as Mathrubhootham
Karthik Kumar as Krish
Shikha as Vėní
M. S. Bhaskar as Santhanam
Radha Ravi as Dada Thulukkanam
T. M. Karthik as Dilli
Anandaraj as Veerappan
Pandiarajan as Madan
Delhi Ganesh as Ganesan
Vasu Vikram as Kittu
Vaiyapuri as Rajappan
"Eeramana Rojave" Siva as Jamindar
Devadarshini as Jamindar's wife
Kuyili
Sathish
V. S. Raghavan as Masilamani, retired Jailor
Sarath Kumar as Karan Muthiah (Cameo appearance)

Soundtrack 
Music was composed by Selvaganesh and lyrics were written by Francis Kruba, Na. Muthukumar, Aandal Priyadarshini and Ramakrishnan.
"Aasaimachane" – Shankar Mahadevan, Anuradha Sriram
"Oru Varam" – S. P. Balasubrahmanyam, K. S. Chithra
"Notta Kudu" – Karthik, Suchithra
"Ada Engengum" – Benny Dayal, Kalpana
"Pootti Vaitha" – Na. Muthukumar

Reception 
Sify wrote "KKM is jolly good fun ride as the director takes us on a treasure hunt, with an adorable lead pair and great supporting actors who will have you in splits. A welcome relief from those larger-than-life heroes, mindless action, this comedy caper is a silly yet surprisingly enjoyable film about misunderstandings and mistaken identities". Rediff wrote "Madhumita's Vallamai Tharayo might have been a dull reworking of Mani Ratnam's Mouna Ragam, but her attempt at comedy sparkles." The Hindu wrote "This family entertainer banks heavily on some classic Crazy Mohan one-liners and PJs hurled at the audience almost relentlessly in its pursuit of the laugh-a-minute promise."

References

External links 
 
 

2010 films
2010s Tamil-language films
Indian comedy films
Indian heist films
Films scored by V. Selvaganesh
Indian slapstick comedy films
Films with screenplays by Crazy Mohan